The South African Permanent Representative in New York City is the official representative of the Government in Pretoria next the Headquarters of the United Nations.

History
In 1945 South Africa was one of the 51 founding member of the United Nations. 
On 12 November 1974 the United Nations General Assembly suspended South Africa from participating in its work, due to international opposition to the policy of apartheid.
In 1994 following its transition into a democracy South Africa was re-admitted to the UN.
Since 1994 the democratically elected government has pursued a foreign policy based on the centrality of the UN in the multilateral system.

List of representatives

References

 
United Nations
South Africa